Lake Karla is a lake that sits at  above sea level making it the only one in the plain of Thessaly. The lake is located at the northern end of the Magnesia regional unit in the Pineios basin, adjacent to Pelion and the Maurovouni mountains. On the eastern part of the lake the lies the town of Kanalia.

Name

Its first name was Boibeis (modern translitteration Voivis) and was taken from the nearby ancient city of Boibe which today is located at Kanalia.

Restoration of the lake
The lake was part of ancient Greek mythology (the god Apollo was married on its shores). Before its drainage, it was the site of a unique fishing culture, with the fishermen spending some nine months of the year in reed huts that they built on the lake. The lake fisheries were an important tradition and to some extent a significant economic activity.

For these reasons, and because agriculture was never successful in the saline soils of the former lake bed, the local population supported an ambitious project to restore the lake. The restoration was intended to reflood only 50 of the original 180 km2 of the former lake. Initially, the project represented a 100 million ECU investment that was financed with the support of the European Commission. Some technical aspects still required further elaboration in order to ensure that it is environmentally sound, but the project had so much popular and political support that it went ahead. It represents one of the most ambitious wetland restoration projects and a good case study for the Ramsar Convention.

The lake was "inaugurated" in October 2018 and now contains even more water than planned. This project is unique to the Balkans and Europe and has been nominated for the EU-Council Prize.

Other notable facts
After draining, site included Mavrovouni Mountain, two water reservoirs in former Lake Karla and the spring Kefalovryso in Velestino. Mavrovouni (max elevation ) extends between Ossa and Pilio mountains and was restored totally in Magnesia. It mainly consists of schist and, in less extent, of limestone. The marine area covered 2% of the site, the terrestrial area covered 96% and the reservoirs covered 2%.

Its northeast side ends in steep cliffs in the Aegean Sea. At the higher zone, it is mainly covered by oak forests (especially Quercus conferta) and at lower parts by beech and chestnut forests. Maquis covers the lower zone. At the eastern part of the mountain it is very dense and dominated by holm oak (Quercus ilex). The rest of maquis is dominated by kermes oak and wild olive and has deteriorated as a result of intense grazing. This area is used for pasture by high numbers of farm animals. Mavrovouni also includes ravines, rock formations, grasslands, phrygana and agricultural land. A significant number of streams run down the mountain, most of them drying in summer. At the banks of the streams there are plane trees, alders, poplars and willows.

The two water reservoirs, one near Stefanovikio and the other near Kalamaki, were constructed in 1988 for irrigation purposes in the area of the former Lake Karla. Their water flowed in from the river Pineios through the Asmaki stream. However, industrial and agricultural wastes flowed into the reservoirs. They were eutrophic and a rapid increase of reedbeds into them was observed.
Kefalovryso spring has suffered the effects of human activities. Its area has been reduced, it has lost its natural vegetation and possibly its native fishes, as well. Now it is used as a pond for the production of commercial (trout etc.) and exotic fishes.

Notes
The habitat type 5420 concerns mainly Cistus salviifolius, Cistus creticus, Cistus monspeliensis, Thymus capitatus, Ballota acetabulosa, Sarcopoterium spinosum and Genista acanthoclada.
The reedbeds (Phragmites australis), occurring in the two reservoirs and not included in Annex I, could constitute an additional habitat type.

See also
 CORINE

References

External links
Ramsar
BirdLife IBA Factsheet
Scientific publications for Lake Karla, Greece

Lakes of Greece
Mountain lakes
Landforms of Thessaly
Landforms of Magnesia (regional unit)